This is a list of town halls in Melbourne, Australia, with the local municipality listed after them.

Box Hill Town Hall – City of Whitehorse
Brighton Town Hall, Melbourne – City of Bayside
Broadmeadows Town Hall – City of Hume
Brunswick Town Hall – City of Moreland
Camberwell Town Hall – City of Boroondara
Clocktower Centre (formerly Essendon Town Hall) – City of Moonee Valley
Coburg City Hall – City of Moreland
Collingwood Town Hall – City of Yarra
Dandenong Town Hall – City of Greater Dandenong
Fitzroy Town Hall – City of Yarra
Footscray Town Hall –City of Maribyrnong
Glen Eira Town Hall (formerly Caulfield City Hall) – City of Glen Eira
Hawthorn Town Hall – City of Boroondara
Heidelberg Town Hall – City of Banyule
Kensington Town Hall – City of Melbourne
Kew Town Hall - City of Boroondara
Melbourne Town Hall – City of Melbourne
Moorabbin Town Hall – City of Kingston
Northcote Town Hall – City of Darebin
North Melbourne Town Hall (formerly Hotham Town Hall) – City of Melbourne
Oakleigh Town Hall - City of Monash
Port Melbourne Town Hall – City of Port Phillip
Prahran Town Hall – City of Stonnington
Preston Town Hall – City of Darebin
Richmond Town Hall – City of Yarra
South Melbourne Town Hall (formerly Emerald Hill Town Hall) – City of Port Phillip
St Kilda Town Hall – City of Port Phillip
Stonnington City Centre (formerly Malvern Town Hall) – City of Stonnington
Williamstown Town Hall – City of Hobsons Bay

See also
List of Melbourne suburbs
Local government areas of Victoria

References

External links

Town halls, Melbourne

Local government-related lists